Timmeri Kumar (born 22 October 1992) is an Indian cricketer. He made his Twenty20 debut for Andhra Pradesh in the 2016–17 Inter State Twenty-20 Tournament on 2 February 2017.

References

External links
 

1992 births
Living people
Indian cricketers
Andhra cricketers
Cricketers from Vijayawada